Nordihydrocapsaicin is a capsaicinoid and analog and congener of capsaicin in chili peppers (Capsicum).

Properties 

Like capsaicin, it is an irritant. Nordihydrocapsaicin accounts for about 7% of the total capsaicinoids mixture and has about half the pungency of capsaicin. Pure nordihydrocapsaicin is a lipophilic colorless odorless crystalline to waxy solid. On the Scoville scale it has 9,100,000 SHU (Scoville heat units), significantly higher than pepper spray.

See also 
 Capsaicin
 Dihydrocapsaicin
 Homocapsaicin
 Homodihydrocapsaicin
 Nonivamide
 Scoville scale
 Pepper spray
 Spice

References

Capsaicinoids
Acetamides